"Albert" is a short story by Leo Tolstoy.  It was originally published in 1858.

The lead character, Albert, is a homeless, yet brilliant, violinist.  The kind Delesov wanted to save the young violinist, but after taking him home, discovers that Albert's drinking and temper threaten to destroy his entire family.  

Albert has been described as reflection on moral questions of art, and society's ability to recognize true art.

Links

 Source of text.
 Albert, at RevoltLib.com
 Albert, at Marxists.org
 Albert, at TheAnarchistLibrary.org

See also

 Bibliography of Leo Tolstoy

References



Short stories by Leo Tolstoy
1858 short stories